Mongia or Monga is an Indian (Khatri) surname. Notable people with the surname include:

Atul Mongia (born 1978), Indian actor
Dinesh Mongia (born 1977), Indian cricketer
Mohit Mongia (born 1999), Indian cricketer, son of Nayan
Nayan Mongia (born 1969), Indian cricketer
R. S. Mongia (1940–2017), justice

See also
Monga (disambiguation)

Indian surnames
Punjabi-language surnames
Surnames of Indian origin
Hindu surnames
Khatri clans
Khatri surnames